NJ Transit Bus Operations''' and companies leasing buses from NJ Transit use various models of buses between 25 and 60 feet in length to provide service within the state of New Jersey. The lists and rosters below list current and past buses purchased new or inherited by NJ Transit for heavy duty fixed-route service.

 Active fleet 
All buses here are fully ADA compliant. Unless noted otherwise, all units for an order operate under NJ Transit.

 Future Fleet 

 Demo buses 

 Retired Production Buses 
 Acquired Before 1980 This list includes Transport of New Jersey, NJDOT-owned, and NJ Transit buses.''
1960-1973 GMC "New Look" – majority inherited from Transport of New Jersey and the Maplewood Equipment Company.
Late 1960s MCI MC-7 – majority were ex-Greyhound
1970s GMC PD-4106 and PD-4107 ("Buffalo")
1973 Highway Products, Inc. TC-31 – assigned to Passaic-Athenia Bus Lines, maybe others
1975-1978 MCI MC-8 – purchased surplus from various sources
1976 Flxible 35096-8-1 (30 feet) most were assigned to private carriers.
1976 Flxible 45102-8-1 (35 feet) – most assigned to private carriers. Some units were built with single doors.
1976 Flxible 53096-8-1 (40 feet/96 inches) – most assigned to private carriers. Some units were built with single doors and suburban-style seating.
1976 Flxible 53102-8-1 (40 feet/102 inches) – most assigned to private carriers. Some units were built with single doors and suburban-style seating.
1979 Flxible 870 – purchased secondhand as replacements for destroyed ex-NYCT 870s.
Various GM Buffalo style buses – late 1970s model years, purchased secondhand
Various Flxible "New Look" buses – various model years, purchased secondhand.

Acquired After 1980 
Buses with a "PA" prefix were purchased using Port Authority of New York and New Jersey funds.

Notes

References 

NJ Transit Bus Operations